Ceegaag is a town located in the Togdheer region of Somaliland. It has an elementary, middle, and secondary school. A maternal and infant health center was opened in the town in 2012.

See also
Administrative divisions of Somaliland
Regions of Somaliland
Districts of Somaliland
Somalia–Somaliland border

References

Populated places in Togdheer